The Green Party of Malaysia is a political party in Malaysia with an environmentalism focus. It was formed in 2010 as a virtual movement. Founder Azlan Adnan's original intent was to empower and unite all Environmental NGOs (ENGOs) in Malaysia and to push the green agenda into the Malaysian political consciousness. The party is affiliated with Himpunan Hijau with more than 80 NGO's. The party was initially anti-Barisan Nasional but over the years have become more divergent and is more critical of both Barisan Nasional and Pakatan Harapan. 

As of 2022, the party had not contested in any elections on the national and statewide level. Abdul Razak Ismail announced the party would contest in the 2023 Selangor state election.

See also
 Green party
 Asia Pacific Greens Federation

References

External links
 
 

Political parties in Malaysia
Green political parties
2010 establishments in Malaysia
Environmental organisations based in Malaysia
Environmentalism in Malaysia